Julio Valle Castillo (born  August 10, 1952), was born in Masaya, Nicaragua. He is a Poet, painter, and a literary critic, and art critic.

Early life and career
Valle-Castillo studied Hispanic Language and Literature at the National Autonomous University in Mexico. Valle-Castillo began publishing his poems in Pablo Antonio Cuadra's newspaper supplement, "La Prensa Literaria", in the 1970s. Valle-Castillo later published his first book in 1977, "Las Armas Iniciales". Valle-Castillo, along with Mayra Jiménez, served as editor of "Poesía Libre", a monthly publication published during the Sandinista government.

As of 2006, Julio Valle-Castillo served as the director of the Instituto Nicaragüense de Cultura (INC) (Nicaraguan Institute of Culture).

Literary works
Published
Las armas iniciales (1977)
Las primeras notas del laúd (1977)
Formas migratorias (1979)
Materia jubilosa (1986)
Ronda tribal para el nacimiento de Sandino (1981)
Con los pasos cantados (1998)

Poetry
Poetas modernistas de Nicaragua (1978)
Rimbaud entre nosotros (1993)
Poesía francesa / Traducciones nicaragüenses (1993);
Hija del día / Artes poéticas nicaragüenses (1994);
Nicaragua: cuentos escogidos (1998)
Cuentos nicaragüenses (2002)

Essays
El inventario del paraíso (1986)
La catedral de León de Nicaragua (2000)
Las humanidades de la poesía nicaragüense (2001)

Novel
Réquiem en Castilla del Oro (1966)

See also
Literature of Nicaragua
Culture of Nicaragua

References

External links
Julio Valle Castillo - Dariana; Diccionario de escritores nicaragüenses 

1952 births
20th-century Nicaraguan poets
21st-century Nicaraguan poets
Nicaraguan male poets
Nicaraguan art critics
Nicaraguan artists
National Autonomous University of Mexico alumni
Living people
Nicaraguan novelists